The 76th district of the Texas House of Representatives consists of a portion of Fort Bend County. The current Representative is Suleman Lalani, who has represented the district since 2023.

References 

76